Hamlet is an opera in two acts by Australian composer Brett Dean, with an English libretto by Matthew Jocelyn, which is based on William Shakespeare's play of the same name. The libretto uses "as little as 20 per cent" of the play's text and also takes inspiration from the "first quarto" as it "offers a different view on certain moments".

The opera premiered at Glyndebourne on 11 June 2017, directed by Neil Armfield and conducted by Vladimir Jurowski. A month later on 6 July, the production was live streamed on Glyndebourne's website free of charge. The production was then presented in 2018 at the Adelaide Festival with Clayton, Gilfry, and Begley from the Glyndebourne cast and Cheryl Barker as Gertrude. The Metropolitan Opera in New York City mounted the Glyndebourne production in May 2022 with several of the original cast members, conducted by Australian conductor Nicholas Carter in his Met debut.

Roles 

Additional roles include an on-stage accordionist (premiere cast: James Crabb). The work is written for large on-stage chorus, as well as an eight-strong 'semi-chorus' in the pit.

Reception 
Erica Jeal, writing for The Guardian in 2017, gave a generally favourable review: "Dean's music is many-layered, full of long, clear vocal lines propelled by repeated rhythmic figures in the orchestra, and has moments of delicate beauty ... and the chorus whispers almost as much as it sings." Rupert Christiansen in The Telegraph noted that the performance appeared to be a hit with the audience—"The first-night audience for Brett Dean's new opera roared its approval so vociferously that I feel almost shame-faced to confess to any reservations about its success"—and complimented it on Dean's music, the actors' vocal performances, and the sound design. However, he was ultimately left cold, saying that "the drama holds attention, but lacks heart and soul" and concluding that "I was far more emotionally engaged by Franco Faccio's romantically overheated Amleto of 1865 ... than I was by this clean, lean and unambiguous vision of a tragedy that should plumb the darkness of moral life. Cara Chanteau in The Independent was also generally favourable but expressed a reservation that "for all the intricate care applied to the instrumentation (fruit of Dean's decade playing viola in the Berlin Philharmonic), the major motor of the piece remains the wordy libretto rather than any developing musical argument." Zachary Woolfe in The New York Times considered it "an adaptation about 'Hamlet' as much as it is an adaptation of 'Hamlet'." Richard Morrison in The Times summed it up as: "Forget Cumberbatch. Forget even Gielgud. I haven't seen a more physically vivid, emotionally affecting or psychologically astute portrayal of the Prince of Denmark than Allan Clayton gives in this sensational production."

In 2019, writers of The Guardian ranked Hamlet the 18th greatest work of art music since 2000, with Fiona Maddocks describing it as an "ingenious reworking of Shakespeare".

References

Sources

 With synopsis.
 Synopsis

Further reading

Operas
2017 operas
English-language operas
Operas based on Hamlet
Compositions by Brett Dean